Kyung-Ho (Ken) Min (born 1935) is an American judoka, taekwondo and yongmudo practitioner, and the founder of University of California Martial Arts Program.

References 

1935 births
Living people
American male judoka
American male taekwondo practitioners
North Korean judoka
Yongmudo practitioners